The "Mormon Political Manifesto" (formally, "The Political Rule of the Church") was a document issued by the Church of Jesus Christ of Latter-day Saints (LDS Church) in 1895 to regulate the involvement of its general authorities in politics. Until the mid-1890s, the LDS Church had proactively supported the [People's Party and entering politics had been seen as almost a part of several church leader's ecclesiastical responsibilities. Leading up to the issuance of the Manifesto, there was major disagreement about church members entering politics. Utah was transitioning to statehood and to a situation where the two national parties dominated Utah politics, and the church began to adopt a posture of political neutrality.

The leaders of the church, led by Church President Wilford Woodruff, decided to establish a written rule that the general authorities of the church would require the approval of the First Presidency before seeking public office. Apostle Moses Thatcher did not agree with the new rule and in 1896 was removed from the Quorum of the Twelve Apostles over the issue. B. H. Roberts, a general authority of the church, resisted the Manifesto at first but agreed to it in 1896 under the threat of being removed from his position.

More recently, the LDS Church has taken a more stringent rule on political involvement by its leaders. Current policies prohibit general authorities not only from running for office but also from contributing financially to political campaigns. This policy was implemented in 2011.

References
Thomas G. Alexander, "Political Manifesto", in Arnold K. Garr, et al., The Encyclopedia of Latter-day Saint History (Salt Lake City, Utah: Deseret Book, 2000), p. 701.

1895 documents
1895 in Utah Territory
1895 in American politics
1895 in Christianity
History of the Church of Jesus Christ of Latter-day Saints
Latter Day Saint movement and society
American political manifestos
Mormonism and politics
Political manifestos